The short-tailed starling (Aplonis minor) is a species of starling in the family Sturnidae. It is found in Indonesia and the Philippines.

Its natural habitats are subtropical or tropical moist lowland forests and subtropical or tropical moist montane forests.

References

short-tailed starling
Birds of the Lesser Sunda Islands
Birds of Mindanao
Birds of Sulawesi
short-tailed starling
short-tailed starling
Taxonomy articles created by Polbot